A bolo is a general term for traditional pre-colonial small to medium-sized single-edged swords or large knives of the Philippines that function as both tools and weapons. They are characterized by a curved wide blade that narrows towards the hilt, with pointed or blunt tips. Bolos are a common tool in the Philippines and are often compared to the machete.

Description
Bolos are differentiated from other Filipino swords and bladed implements by their dual use as both tools and weapons. They are characterized by a curved (usually convex) wide blade that narrows towards the hilt, with pointed or blunt tips. There are various types of bolos differing by ethnic group and purpose, ranging from large knives to short swords to specialized agricultural equipment. They had a wide range of use, from hunting to scything grass, opening coconuts, harvesting crops, or clearing dense brush.

Most bolos are cheap and unornamented, with the handle usually made from plain carabao horn or wood. Bolos with finely carved handles with precious materials were used as status symbols of high social rank.

Common uses 
The bolo is common in the countryside due to its use as a farming implement. As such, it was used extensively during Spanish colonial rule as a manual alternative to ploughing with a carabao. Normally used for cutting coconuts, it was also a common tool for harvesting narrow row crops found on terraces such as rice, mungbean, soybean, and peanut.

Use in warfare
During the American colonial period of the Philippines, Filipino fighters armed with bolos were known as "bolomen". They were used as auxiliary troops by the Americans during the Philippine-American War. They were often placed in front of riflemen, as beliefs in anting-anting. The bolo men were effective in close combat with riflemen using bayonets but were easily defeated if riflemen opened fire on them.

The bolo was adopted by the US Military as the bolo knife. Produced from 1897 to 1918, they remained in service both as a tool for clearing brush and for combat until World War II.

The bolo is also used in Filipino martial arts or Arnis as part of training.

Design 

A bolo is characterized by having a native hardwood or animal horn handle (such as from the carabao), a full tang, and a steel blade that both curves and widens, often considerably so, towards its tip. This moves the centre of gravity as far forward as possible, giving the bolo extra momentum for chopping.

So-called "jungle bolos", intended for combat rather than agricultural work, tend to be longer and less wide at the tip. Bolos for gardening usually have rounded tips.

Types 
The term "bolo" has also expanded to include other traditional blades that primarily or secondarily function as agricultural implements. They include:
Barong - a leaf-shaped sword or knife favored by the Tausug people.
Batangas - a single-edged bolo of the Tagalog people that widens at the tip.
Garab - a sickle used for harvesting rice.
Guna or Bolo-guna - A weeding knife with a very short, wide, dull blade and a perpendicular blunt end. It is used mainly for digging roots and weeding gardens.
Kampilan - a tapering longsword found throughout the Philippines.
Iták - a narrow sword used for combat and self-defense in the Tagalog regions. Like the súndang, it is also known as the "jungle bolo" or "tip bolo", and was a popular weapon during the Philippine Revolution and the Philippine-American War.
Haras - a scythe used for cutting tall grass. It is called "Lampas" by people from Mindanao.
Pinutî - a narrow sword traditionally carried as a personal weapon for combat or self-defense.
Pirah or Pira - a wide-tipped sword or knife favored by the Yakan people, it is also common in the Sulu Archipelago, Mindanao, and the Visayas.
Punyál or Gunong - a dagger derivative of the kalis. Used as a side-weapon in combat, or to kill and bleed pigs during slaughter. Also known under the more generic term kutsilyo (Spanish cuchillo, "knife"). 
Súndang - the most common personal weapon used for combat and self-defense in the Visayas. Also known as the "jungle bolo" or "tip bolo". It was a popular weapon of choice in the Philippine Revolution against the Spanish Empire and during the subsequent Philippine–American War.
Binangon - A form of súndang used in Western Visayas and Negros Island.

Historical significance 
The bolo was the primary weapon used by the Katipunan during the Philippine Revolution. It was also used by the Filipino guerrillas and bolomen during the Philippine–American War.

During World War I, United States Army soldier Henry Johnson gained international fame repelling a German raid in hand-to-hand combat using a bolo.

During World War II, members of the 1st Filipino Regiment and the 81st Division used bolos for close quarters combat, earning them the distinctive title "Moro Bolo Battalion".

On 7 December 1972, would-be assassin Carlito Dimahilig used a bolo to attack former First Lady Imelda Marcos as she appeared onstage at a live televised awards ceremony. Dimahilig stabbed Marcos in the abdomen several times, and she parried the blows with her arms. He was shot dead by security forces while she was taken to a hospital.

Symbolism 
The bolo serves as a symbol for the Katipunan and the Philippine Revolution, particularly the Cry of Pugad Lawin. Several monuments of Andres Bonifacio, as with other notable Katipuneros, depict him holding a bolo in one hand and the Katipunan flag in the other.

Other uses of the term 
In the United States Military, the slang term "to bolo" – to fail a test, exam or evaluation, originated from the combined Philippine-American military forces including recognized guerrillas during the Spanish–American War and the Philippine–American War; those local soldiers and guerrillas who failed to demonstrate proficiency in marksmanship were issued bolos instead of firearms so as not to waste scarce ammunition.

In hand-to-hand combat sports, especially boxing, the term "bolo punch" is used to describe an uppercut thrown in a manner mimicking the arcing motion of a bolo while in use.

Gallery

See also 
 Cane knife
 Dahong palay
 Golok
 Kalis (also called "sundang" in eastern Indonesia)
 Kukri
 Machete
 Operation: BOLO, An American military operation during the Vietnam War
 Parang

References 

Blade weapons
Machetes
Philippine Revolution
Philippine–American War
World War II infantry weapons
Weapons of the Philippine Army
Filipino melee weapons